The Lomas Bosque Challenge was a golf tournament on the Challenge Tour, played in Spain. It was held 1995 at Lomas Bosque GC in Madrid.

Winners

References

External links
Coverage on the Challenge Tour's official site

Former Challenge Tour events
Golf tournaments in Spain
1995 establishments in Spain
1995 disestablishments in Spain